Brick Minaret is a historical minaret in Khorramabad, Iran. This Minaret is close to the Falak-ol-Aflak Castle and was built to help caravans find their ways through dark nights. To facilitate this, a fire was lighted on top of the minaret, which was visible from long distances.
Brick Minaret is now located in the south of Khorramabad, and it is registered on the list of National Monuments.

References 

Buildings and structures in Khorramabad
Towers completed in the 10th century
Minarets in Iran
Tourist attractions in Khorramabad